Elizabeth Wilhide is a prolific writer of books on design and decoration. In a 1995 review in The New York Times, Michael Owens describes her "fully researched" book The Mackintosh Style: Design and Decor as "a keeper". Her book, Scandinavian Modern Home, was Book of the Week at the Evening Standard in September 2008.

An article written by Wilhide on tiles appeared in the Evening Standard at the same time as the publication of her book Surface & Finish.

Wilhide's first novel, Ashenden, was published by Penguin in June 2012. Her second novel, If I Could Tell You, was published by Fig Tree Penguin in February 2016.

Books
Scandinavian Modern Home (2010) 
Extraordinary Dogs (2009) 
Small Spaces: Maximizing Limited Spaces for Living (2009) 
The Interior Design Directory (2009) 
New Decorating: With stylish, practical projects for every room (2008) 
Surface and Finish (2007) 
Converted: How to extend your home up, down and out (2007) 
New Decor (2007) 
The Flooring Book: the essential sourcebook for planning, selecting and restoring floors (2005) 
Light Your Home: A comprehensive guide to practical and decorative lighting (2005) 
Eco: an essential sourcebook for environmentally friendly design and decoration (2004) 
The Ultimate House Book (2003), with Terence Conran 
Materials (2003) 
New Loft Living (2002) 
Bohemian Style (2001) 
Materials: a directory for home design (2001) 
Lighting: a design source book (2001) 
Living with modern classics: the chair (2000) 
Sir Edwin Lutyens: designing in the English tradition (2000) 
The Light: Living with Modern Classics (2000) 
The French Room (2000) with Terence Conran 
The Millennium Dome with The Right Hon. Tony Blair (1999) 
Terence Conran: design and the quality of life (1999) 
William Morris: decor and design (1991) 
The Mackintosh Style: Design and Decor (1998) 
Flowers for All Seasons: Winter (1989) with Jane Packer 
Floors: a design sourcebook (1997) 
Unique Interiors in Minutes (1993) with Stewart Walton 
Creating Space: Essential Home Organization (1998) 
Terence Conran on design (1996) 
Traditional Country Style: Inspirational ideas and practical tips for every room (1996) 
Ashenden (2013) 
Design: The Whole Story (Editor)  (2016) 
If I Could Tell You (2016)

References

Living people
Year of birth missing (living people)
British women novelists